Chinese Taipei School Penang (CTSP) was a Taiwanese (Republic of China) international school in Penang, Malaysia.

The school, which serves levels elementary through senior high school, was first established on 25 February 1995. It is the first Overseas Taiwan School. The current school was established on 1 August 2005 in place of the Penang Taiwan School/Penang Tai Chiao School due to administration issues in the former school. As of 2016 it has 30 teachers, 135 ROC national students, and 10 students of other nationalities. This school has closed for now.

References

External links

 Chinese Taipei School Penang
 Chinese Taipei School Penang 

Taiwanese international schools in Malaysia
International schools in Malaysia
1995 establishments in Malaysia
Educational institutions established in 1995
Malaysia–Taiwan relations